Ariestides González Ortíz (born January 12, 1961) is a boxer from Puerto Rico, who won the bronze medal in the Middleweight division (71–75 kg) at the 1984 Summer Olympics in Los Angeles. He shared the podium with Algeria's Mohamed Zaoui.  Although Juan Evangelista Venegas was the first Puerto Rican to win an olympic medal (boxing, 1948) González was the second to win a medal representing Puerto Rico under the Puerto Rican flag, after Orlando Maldonado became the first at the 1976 Summer Olympics.

References

1961 births
Living people
People from Añasco, Puerto Rico
Boxers at the 1984 Summer Olympics
Olympic boxers of Puerto Rico
Olympic bronze medalists for Puerto Rico
Olympic medalists in boxing
Puerto Rican male boxers
Medalists at the 1984 Summer Olympics
Middleweight boxers
20th-century Puerto Rican people